Kei Nishikori defeated Santiago Giraldo in the final, 6–2, 6–2, to win the singles title at the 2014 Barcelona Open. He became the first non-Spanish player to win the tournament since 2002.

Rafael Nadal was the three-time defending champion, but lost to Nicolás Almagro in the quarterfinals, marking his first loss at the event since 2003.

Seeds
All seeds receive a bye into the second round.

  Rafael Nadal (quarterfinals)
  David Ferrer (second round)
  Fabio Fognini (second round, retired because of fatigue)
  Kei Nishikori (champion)
  Tommy Robredo (third round)
  Nicolás Almagro (semifinals)
  Jerzy Janowicz (second round)
  Alexandr Dolgopolov (second round)

  Ernests Gulbis (semifinals)
  Philipp Kohlschreiber (quarterfinals, retired)
  Fernando Verdasco (third round)
  Marin Čilić (quarterfinals)
  Feliciano López (second round)
  Marcel Granollers (second round)
  Dmitry Tursunov (second round)
  Benoît Paire (second round, retired)

Draw

Finals

Top half

Section 1

Section 2

Bottom half

Section 3

Section 4

Qualifying

Seeds

 Dominic Thiem (qualified)
 Stéphane Robert (qualifying competition)
 Evgeny Donskoy (qualifying competition)
 Peter Gojowczyk (first round, retired)
 Andrey Kuznetsov (qualified)
 Jesse Huta Galung (qualifying competition)
 Andreas Beck (qualified)
 Marsel İlhan (qualified)
 Thomas Fabbiano (first round)
 Ante Pavić (first round)
 Márton Fucsovics (qualifying competition)
 Matteo Viola (qualified)

Qualifiers

  Dominic Thiem
  Andreas Beck
  Matteo Viola
  Marc López
  Andrey Kuznetsov
  Marsel İlhan

Qualifying draw

First qualifier

Second qualifier

Third qualifier

Fourth qualifier

Fifth qualifier

Sixth qualifier

References
 Main Draw
 Qualifying Draw

Barcelona Open Banco Sabadellandnbsp;- Singles